Coroatá is a municipality in Maranhão.

History
It was settled by the Portuguese and became a village in 1843. By 1912 work on railroads, to give greater connection to cities, had occurred. In 1920 Coroatá was incorporated as a city and 1920 is deemed its "founding." It has a population of 65,544.

Religion
The population is 75.1% Catholic and the Roman Catholic Diocese of Coroatá is located there. In addition to Catholics 14.2% are Protestant, 2.3% belong to other forms of Christianity, 0.3% are of Afro-Brazilian religion, 0.1% of other religions, and 8% are of no religion.

Mayors of Coroatá

José Jansen Pereira - 1920
João Rios - 1926
Benedito Alves Cardoso - 1931
Luis Pereira da Silva - 1937
João Coelho Matos - 1939
Valdemiro de Almeida Cavalcante - 1939
Sebastião Anfiloquio Alves - 1940
Otacílio de Sousa Santos - 1943
Antonio Serra Pinto - 1945
Chico Pereira Lobo - 1945
Emilio Lobato de Azevedo - 1948
José Menezes Junior - 1951
Nagib Rabelo Lamar - 1952
João Saraiva Filho - 1955
Leodegário Jansen Pereira - 1956
Simão de Monaut Serra Pinto - 1960
Vitor Dias Trovão - 1968
João Mota de Queiroz - 1970
Orlando Jansen Silva - 1971
João Ferreira Pereira - 1972
Gentil Augusto Frazão Filho - 1973
José de Ribamar Trovão - 1977
Francisco Alberto Araújo - 1983
Luis Montenegro Tavares - 1983
José Ribamar Trovão - 1989
Coronel Ruy Salomão - 1991
Maria Teresa Trovão Murad - 1993
Romulo Augusto Trovão Moreira Lima - 1997/2004
Luís Mendes Ferreira 2004/2012
Maria Teresa Trovão Murad (current mayor)

Notable natives 
Canhoteiro - A Brazilian footballer

References

External links 
Coroatá Online

Municipalities in Maranhão